Peter McLean is an Australian folk singer/songwriter. In January 1973, his single "Tom" peaked at number 48 on the Australian singles chart.

Discography

Studio albums

Extended plays

Singles

References

20th-century Australian male singers